Kira Phillips (born 16 May 1995) is an Australian rules footballer who played for the Fremantle Football Club in the AFL Women's competition. Phillips was drafted by Fremantle with their sixth selection and forty-fifth overall in the 2016 AFL Women's draft. She made her debut in the draw against  at Blacktown ISP Oval in round three of the 2017 season. After her debut match, she played every match for the year to finish with five matches. She was delisted at the end of the 2017 season.

References

External links 

1995 births
Living people
Fremantle Football Club (AFLW) players
Australian rules footballers from Western Australia
Indigenous Australian players of Australian rules football